Ska Crazy is the studio album in follow of the Neville Staple's album The Rude Boy Returns back in 2004. Ska Crazy was released on Cleopatra Records in May 2014.

Track Listing

Personnel  
Neville Staple - Arranger, Composer, Primary Artist, Vocal
Stephen Armstrong - Arranger, Bass, Composer, Guitar, Producer, Background Vocals
Joe Atkinson - Keyboards
Winston Bailey, Hyiton Beckford, Cecil Campbell, Derrick Crooks, Lynval Golding, Terry Hall, Justin Hinds, Bunny Lee, Max Romeo, Leroy Sibbles - Composers
Matty Bane, Trevor Evans, Machine, Winston Marche - Drums
Rob Coates, Tom Lawry -  Engineers
Christine Coffey - Vocals
Gareth John, Jon Read - Trumpet
Warren Middleton - Trombone
Andrew Perriss - Guitar, Background Vocals
Drew Stansall - Alto and Tenor saxophone
James Wilkes, Charlotte Worthy-Jarvis - Keyboard Engineer
Daddy Woody - Toasting

References 

2014 albums
Neville Staple albums